The school promotes traditional Indian values in students, such as touching the feet of elders to celebrating festivals of all religions. Students also practice Yoga, Meditation and Vedic Recitation.

Official website

References

Boarding schools in Telangana
Medak district
1996 establishments in India
Educational institutions established in 1996